Morrison is a city in Grundy County, Iowa, United States. The population was 98 at the time of the 2020 census. It is part of the Waterloo–Cedar Falls Metropolitan Statistical Area. In the 2019 city election, the city of Morrison reelected The Honorable David Hach as Mayor to his third term. He has brought significant reforms to the city, including paving roads, flood water mitigation and leading through reconstruction following the devastating derecho of 2020 which caused damage to numerous homes and trees throughout the community.

Geography
Morrison is located at  (42.343390, -92.674434).

The Black Hawk Creek flows north of the city.

Demographics

2010 census
As of the census of 2010, there were 94 people, 40 households, and 26 families living in the city. The racial makeup of the city was 92.6% White, 2.1% African American, 1.1% Asian, and 4.3% from two or more races.

There were 40 households, of which 30.0% had children under the age of 18 living with them, 60.0% were married couples living together, 5.0% had a male householder with no wife present, and 35.0% were non-families. 30.0% of all households were made up of individuals, and 10% had someone living alone who was 65 years of age or older. The average household size was 2.35 and the average family size was 2.88.

The median age in the city was 40.5 years. 24.5% of residents were under the age of 18; 7.4% were between the ages of 18 and 24; 24.4% were from 25 to 44; 25.5% were from 45 to 64; and 18.1% were 65 years of age or older. The gender makeup of the city was 52.1% male and 47.9% female.

2000 census
As of the census of 2000, there were 97 people, 43 households, and 30 families living in the city. The racial makeup of the city was 98.97% White, and 1.03% from two or more races.

There were 43 households, out of which 23.3% had children under the age of 18 living with them, 55.8% were married couples living together, 4.7% had a female householder with no husband present, and 30.2% were non-families. 25.6% of all households were made up of individuals, and 11.6% had someone living alone who was 65 years of age or older. The average household size was 2.26 and the average family size was 2.67.

In the city, the population was spread out, with 18.6% under the age of 18, 6.2% from 18 to 24, 18.6% from 25 to 44, 34.0% from 45 to 64, and 22.7% who were 65 years of age or older. The median age was 48 years. For every 100 females, there were 142.5 males. For every 100 females age 18 and over, there were 146.9 males.

The median income for a household in the city was $26,250, and the median income for a family was $31,875. Males had a median income of $21,500 versus $15,625 for females. The per capita income for the city was $12,538. There were no families and 11.6% of the population living below the poverty line, including no under eighteens and 16.0% of those over 64.

References

Cities in Iowa
Cities in Grundy County, Iowa
Waterloo – Cedar Falls metropolitan area